Podemos (lit. We Can) previously: Movimiento Reformador ( lit. Reform Movement) is a conservative-liberal political party in Guatemala. It is led by Jorge Briz Abularach.

2003 election
At the 2003 general election held on 9 November 2003, the party was part of the Grand National Alliance. In the legislative election, the Alliance won 24.3% of the vote, and 47 out of 158 seats in Congress. The presidential candidate of the alliance, Óscar Berger Perdomo, won 34.3% at the presidential elections of the same day. He won 54.1% in the second round and was elected president.

Party leader Jorge Briz, who had run unsuccessfully for mayor of Guatemala City, was rewarded with the position of Foreign Minister in Berger's cabinet, a post he held until resigning in August 2006. Shortly after his resignation from the cabinet, the Reform Movement officially broke with the GANA alliance.

2007 election
The Reform Movement declined to participate in the 2007 general election.

Electoral results

Presidential elections

Legislative elections

Notes

References

Liberal parties in North America
Conservative parties in Guatemala
Political parties with year of establishment missing